Renze District formerly, Renxian, is a district in the southwest of Hebei province, China. It is under the administration of the prefecture-level city of Xingtai. Its postal code is 055150. The county seat is located in Rencheng Town.

Administrative divisions
Renze consists of 3 towns and 5 townships.

Towns:
Rencheng, Xingjiawan, Xindian

Townships:
Luozhuang Township, Tiankou Township, Datun Township, Yongfuzhuang Township, Xigucheng Township

Climate

References

County-level divisions of Hebei
Xingtai